Highway 308 is a highway in the Canadian province of Saskatchewan. It runs from Highway 8 until the Manitoba border, where it transitions into Provincial Road 571.

Highway 308 passes through the town of Welwyn and intersects Highway 600.

References

308